The Westminster Almshouses Foundation is based at Palmers House, 42 Rochester Row, London. Its building is a grade II listed building.

See also
 James Palmer

References

External links 

http://www.westminsteralmshouses.com/

Almshouses in London
Grade II listed almshouses
Grade II listed buildings in the City of Westminster